Tanbaku Kar may refer to:
 Tanbaku Kar, Lali
 Tanbaku Kar-e Ali
 Tanbaku Kar-e Ebrahim
 Tanbaku Kar-e Pain